There are several rivers named Palmeiras River in Brazil:

 Palmeiras River (Goiás), river in Goiás state in central Brazil
 Palmeiras River (Tocantins), river in Tocantins state in central Brazil